Anupam Kher (born 7 March 1955) is an Indian actor and producer who works in Hindi and a few English, Malayalam,Punjabi, Tamil and Telugu language films. He is considered one of the most versatile film actors of India. He has played variety of characters including numerous critically acclaimed leading or parallel roles. His accolades include two National Film Awards and eight Filmfare Awards. The Government of India honoured him with the Padma Shri in 2004 and the Padma Bhushan in 2016 for his contribution in the field of Indian cinema and arts.

Besides working in Hindi films, he has also appeared in international films such as the Golden Globe nominated Bend It Like Beckham (2002), Ang Lee's Golden Lion–winning Lust, Caution (2007), David O. Russell's Oscar-winning Silver Linings Playbook (2012) and Anthony Maras' Hotel Mumbai (2019). He received a BAFTA nomination for his supporting role in the British television sitcom The Boy with the Topknot (2018).

He has previously served as the Chairman of the Central Board of Film Certification and the National School of Drama in India.
Kher was appointed Chairman of the Film and Television Institute of India (FTII) in October 2017. His appointment was controversial, given his support for the Bharatiya Janata Party. A year later, he resigned as the chairman of the FTII, citing his work commitments for the American TV show New Amsterdam.

Early life and background
Kher was born on 7 March 1955 in a Kashmiri Pandit family in Shimla. His father, Pushkar Nath Kher was a clerk in the forest department of Himachal Pradesh and his mother, Dulari Kher was a housewife. He was educated at D. A. V. School in Shimla. He studied economics at Government College, Sanjauli at the Himachal Pradesh University in Shimla, but dropped out to study Indian theatre at Panjab University, Chandigarh.

In 1978, Kher graduated from the National School of Drama (NSD) in New Delhi. Some of his early roles were in plays performed at the Himachal Pradesh University. He taught drama in Raj Bisaria's Bharatendu Natya Akademi in Lucknow for a small part in his directorial debut movie Sheeshay ka Ghar.

Acting career

Debut, career struggles, and breakthrough (1984–88)
In his struggling days as an actor in Bombay (present-day Mumbai), he slept on a railway platform for a month.

In 1984, Kher made his acting debut in Hindi films with the Mahesh Bhatt-directed drama film Saaransh, in which he portrayed a 65-year-old retired middle class teacher who loses his son. The film was a moderate box office success though Kher's performance earned him widespread praise. He won a number of awards for his portrayal of the elderly father, including the Filmfare Award for Best Actor. Kher said that he lost his hair at a young age, and thus, his first role was playing a 65-year-old at the age of 29.

From 1985 to 1988, he continued to work in several other projects. All of them were moderately successful, and his performance in that film was not well received. However, Kher's performance as Shyam Lal, a man whose daughter is forced to dance to make money for him, in N. Chandra's action thriller Tezaab (1988), which was the top-grossing film of the year and co-starred Anil Kapoor and Madhuri Dixit, was highly appreciated. Later in 1988, his performance in the poorly-received Vijay was praised too, winning him a Filmfare Award for Best Supporting Actor.

Public recognition (1989–1999)
Kher's career improved in 1989, when he received wider recognition for his performances in Ram Lakhan, a thriller by Subhash Ghai, and Daddy, a television film that reunited him with Bhatt. The former co-starred an ensemble cast including Anil Kapoor, Madhuri Dixit, Jackie Shroff, Dimple Kapadia, Raakhee, Satish Kaushik, Amrish Puri and Paresh Rawal, and featured Kher in the supporting part of Deodhar Shastri, a man who disapproves his daughter's marriage with her childhood friend who is also her love interest. Ram Lakhan proved to be the second highest-grossing Hindi film of the year with a gross of over  worldwide. The latter earned him universal acclaim, with several critics calling it his best performance at that point. Both Daddy and Ram Lakhan earned Kher several awards; for the former, he won a National Film Award – Special Mention and a Filmfare Critics Award for Best Performance; and for the latter, he garnered his first Filmfare Award for Best Performance in a Comic Role (shared with Kaushik), also known as the Filmfare Award for Best Comedian.

Later in 1989, Kher starred in a sequel to the 1986 fantasy film Nagina, entitled Nigahen: Nagina Part II. Co-starring alongside Sridevi and Sunny Deol, he portrayed a snake charmer named Gorakh Nath. It did not perform well at the box office. He then appeared in a cameo for Yash Chopra's love triangle Chandni, and portrayed a police inspector in Vidhu Vinod Chopra's action film Parinda alongside Anil Kapoor, Madhuri Dixit, Jackie Shroff and Nana Patekar. Despite received a poor opening, Parinda was a critical and commercial success. Kher's final film of the year was Pankaj Parashar's slapstick comedy ChaalBaaz alongside Sridevi, Deol, and Rajinikanth. Despite receiving mixed reviews from critics, ChaalBaaz emerged as an economic success.

Kher has also played a variety of roles. For his role in Daddy (1989), he received the Filmfare Critics Award for Best Performance.

In 1990, Kher portrayed the antagonistic role of Hazari Prasad, a miser who tries to find a rich woman to marry his poor son, in Indra Kumar's directorial debut—the romance Dil, co-starring Aamir Khan and Madhuri Dixit. Dil received positive reviews from critics, and Kher's performance was praised.

In 1991, Kher once again received acclaim for his work in Yash Chopra's romantic drama Lamhe, which starred Sridevi and Anil Kapoor and featured him as Kapoor's childhood friend. Lamhe was a box office failure in India, but was an overseas success. Despite the film's poor performance at the box office, Kher won his second Filmfare Best Comedian Award for his performance.

His comical performance in the film earned him another nomination for the Filmfare Award for Best Comedian. Later that year, he portrayed Dixit's uncle in the drama Khel, which earned him a third and a second consecutive Filmfare Best Comedian Award.

Kher next reunited with Yash Chopra for the romantic thriller Darr (1993), co-starring Shah Rukh Khan, Juhi Chawla, and Sunny Deol, in which he starred as Chawla's brother. One of the top-grossing Hindi films of the year, it earned over  worldwide, and garnered Kher a fourth and a third consecutive Best Comedian at Filmfare. In addition to other awards, it won the National Film Award for Best Popular Film Providing Wholesome Entertainment.

In 1994, Kher portrayed the owner of a factory in Raj Kanwar's thriller Laadla alongside Sridevi, Anil Kapoor, Aruna Irani, Raveena Tandon and Farida Jalal. It received mixed reviews from critics, though became commercially successful, and grossed over  worldwide. He eventually earned another Best Supporting Actor nomination at Filmfare, and the film proved his second consecutive movie to win the National Film Award for Best Popular Film.

Kher's only release in 1995 was Aditya Chopra's romantic drama Dilwale Dulhania Le Jayenge, starring Shah Rukh Khan and Kajol, about two non-residential Indians who fall in love during a trip across Europe. Kher's work as Dharamvir, the father of Khan's character, fetched him a fifth Filmfare Best Comedian Award. Dilwale Dulhania Le Jayenge emerged as his second consecutive film to earn over  worldwide, becoming a blockbuster just like Hum Aapke Hain Koun..!, and third consecutive film to win the National Film Award for Best Popular Film. His next two films were the box office flops Chaahat (1996) and Gudgudee (1997). In both these films, Kher's performance was not well received.

He next starred alongside Shah Rukh Khan, Kajol, Rani Mukerji, and Archana Puran Singh in Karan Johar's romance Kuch Kuch Hota Hai (1998). In this film, Kher played the comic role of Mr. Malhotra, a college principal.

In 1999, Kher played the father of Anil Kapoor's character in Satish Kaushik's women-centric drama Hum Aapke Dil Mein Rehte Hain, that received positive reviews from critics and was a commercial success. He then teamed with David Dhawan for the comedy-drama Haseena Maan Jaayegi starring Sanjay Dutt, Govinda and Karisma Kapoor. He was awarded the best actor at New York city International Film Festival for his Performance in a short film titled Happy Birthday.
He played the role of the Police Commissioner, Rathor, in the critically and commercially acclaimed film, A Wednesday.

International recognition 
Kher is known internationally for Bend It Like Beckham (2002), Bride and Prejudice (2004), The Mistress of Spices (2006) and Lust, Caution (2007), Speedy Singhs (2011), and TV show ER. In 2012, he co-starred in the Academy Award-winning Silver Linings Playbook.

Other notable works (2007 - present) 
In 2007, Anupam Kher and Satish Kaushik, who studied together at NSD, started a film production company, Karol Bagh Productions. Their first film, Tere Sang, was directed by Satish Kaushik. In 2011, he starred alongside Mohanlal and Jaya Prada in the Malayalam language romantic drama Pranayam. Kher chose Pranayam as one of the seven best films of his career. He also starred in a number of Marathi films such as Thoda Tuza...Thoda Maza, Kashala Udyachi Baat, and Punjabi films such as Yaaran Naal Baharan.

In 2009, Kher voiced Carl Fredricksen in the Hindi-dubbed version of the Disney-Pixar animated film Up. Anupam Kher has also appeared in The Dirty Politics. The movie also features Om Puri and Jackie Shroff Kher has appeared in several films of director Neeraj Pandey, has played pivotal roles in Special 26 (2013),  Baby (2015) and M.S. Dhoni: The Untold Story (2016), for which he won Filmfare Award for Best Supporting Actor. In 2014, Kher starred in the British film Shongram, a fictional romantic drama set during the 1971 Bangladesh Liberation War. 

In 2019, Kher starred as the former Indian Prime minister Manmohan Singh in the political, biographical drama film The Accidental Prime Minister. In 2022, Kher starred in the Vivek Agnihotri's controversial The Kashmir Files along with Mithun Chakraborty, which is based on Kashmiri Pandits' genocide in 1990, the film went to become a huge box office success. Kher's performance was generally praised by the film critics.

Other ventures

He hosted TV shows such as Say Na Something To Anupam Uncle, Sawaal Dus Crore Ka, Lead India, and The Anupam Kher Show - Kucch Bhi Ho Sakta Hai. 

He ventured into directing with Om Jai Jagadish (2002) and has been a producer. He produced and starred in the film Maine Gandhi Ko Nahin Mara (2005). He received the Best Actor Award from the Karachi International Film Festival for his performance.

From October 2003 to October 2004 he served as chairman of the Indian Film Censor Board.

In 2011 Kher released his first book The Best Thing About You is You!, which was a best-seller. His biography Lessons Life Taught Me Unknowingly was published on 5 August 2019 by Penguin Random House. In 2020, he wrote Your Best Day Is Today!, based on his experiences of COVID-19 crisis. Remembering his father on his 9th Death Anniversary, he presented a poem written by Lucknow based Poet Pankaj Prasun and posted it on social media.

Kher has written and starred in a play about his own life called Kucch Bhi Ho Sakta Hai, which was directed by Feroz Abbas Khan.

In 2016, Anupam Kher was a narrator in the ABP News documentary TV series Bharatvarsh, which showcased the journey from ancient India to the 19th century.

In late 2016, Anupam Kher produced Khwaabon Ki Zamin Par, a TV drama airing on Zindagi.

Starting in fall of 2018, Anupam Kher starred in a new NBC medical drama TV series New Amsterdam as Dr. Vijay Kapoor (a neurologist). He also appeared as Shahbaz Karim in the BBC1 drama Mrs Wilson.

Personal life
In 1985, he married actress Kirron Kher who is a Member of parliament from Chandigarh, belonging to the Bharatiya Janata Party. Her son, his stepson, is actor Sikandar Kher. In 2010, he was appointed as the goodwill ambassador of the Pratham Education Foundation, which strives to improve children's education in India. Kher is an ardent supporter of the Bharatiya Janata Party (BJP) and Indian Prime minister Narendra Modi.

On 20 September 2021, Kher was awarded an honorary doctorate degree in Philosophy of Hindu Studies by the Hindu University of America.

Filmography

Controversies 
In 2017, Kher was accused of threatening to ruin the career of Rita Koiral, a Bengali actress, to cover up a voice acting controversy involving his actor wife, Kirron Kher.

In January 2020, he was involved in a verbal spat with actor Naseeruddin Shah and called him frustrated and a drug addict after the latter called him a clown and a sycophant.

Awards and honours

References

External links

  – Anupam kher
 
Anupam Kher Foundation
 Anupam Kher's Actor Prepares

1955 births
Living people
Indian male film actors
Indian male voice actors
Male actors in Hindi cinema
Indian male stage actors
National School of Drama alumni
National School of Drama
Indian drama teachers
Recipients of the Padma Shri in arts
Filmfare Awards winners
Screen Awards winners
Male actors from Himachal Pradesh
People from Shimla
Dayanand Anglo-Vedic Schools System alumni
Indian male comedians
Kashmiri actors
Indian people of Kashmiri descent
Recipients of the Padma Bhushan in arts
20th-century Indian male actors
21st-century Indian male actors
Film producers from Himachal Pradesh
Film directors from Himachal Pradesh
Male actors in Punjabi cinema
Male actors in Tamil cinema
Male actors in Marathi cinema
Male actors in Malayalam cinema
Special Jury Award (feature film) National Film Award winners
Special Mention (feature film) National Film Award winners
International Indian Film Academy Awards winners